Senger is a German surname. Notable people with the surname include:

Alexander von Senger (1880–1968), Swiss-born architect in Nazi Germany under Adolf Hitler
Dante Senger (born 1983), Argentine footballer
Darlene Senger (born 1955), member of the Naperville, Illinois City Council
Ferdinand Maria von Senger und Etterlin (1923–1987), soldier in the German Army, civilian jurist
Fridolin von Senger und Etterlin (1891–1963), German general during World War II
Werner Senger, German handballer
Marvin Senger (born 2000), German footballer

See also
Senger Line or Hitler Line, German defensive line in central Italy during the Second World War
Sanger (disambiguation)

German-language surnames